Dependency theory is a subfield of database theory which studies implication and optimization problems related to logical constraints, commonly called dependencies, on databases.
The best known class of such dependencies are functional dependencies, which form the foundation of keys on database relations. Another important class of dependencies are the multivalued dependencies. A key algorithm in dependency theory is the chase, and much of the theory is devoted to its study.

Dependencies 

 functional dependency
 join dependency
 multivalued dependency
 tuple-generating dependency
 equality-generating dependency
 embedded dependency
 inclusion dependency
 full typed dependency

Database theory
Database constraints